Iljik Son clan is one of the Korean clans. Their Bon-gwan is in Andong, North Gyeongsang Province. According to the research held in 2000, the number of members of the Iljik Son clan was 24187. 

Their founder was  who naturalized from the Song dynasty. They included generals such as Son Gan and Son Cheo nul, leader of loyal armies, who beat Toyotomi Hideyoshi who dispatched troops to Korea. Other distinguished military leaders were Son Rin, who distinguished himself in the Later Jin invasion of Joseon and Son Jin min, who became administrative commissioner of the Security Council.

See also 
 Korean clan names of foreign origin

References

External links 
 

 
Son clans
Korean clan names of Chinese origin